Bryan Zaragoza Martínez (born 25 April 2001) is a Spanish professional footballer who plays as a winger for Club Recreativo Granada.

Club career
Born in Málaga, Andalusia, Zaragoza joined Granada CF's youth setup in 2019, from hometown side CD Conejito de Málaga. On 29 May 2020, after finishing his formation, he renewed his contract until 2022, and was loaned to Segunda División B side CD El Ejido on 23 September.

Upon returning in July 2021, Zaragoza was assigned to the reserves in Segunda División RFEF. He made his first-team debut on 30 November, coming on as a half-time substitute in a 7–0 away routing of CD Laguna de Tenerife in the season's Copa del Rey.

On 14 January 2022, Zaragoza renewed his contract until 2024. He made his professional debut on 12 September, replacing Myrto Uzuni in a 4–0 Segunda División away loss against SD Eibar.

Zaragoza scored his first professional goal on 18 November 2022, netting his team's third in a 4–0 home routing of Albacete Balompié.

References

External links

2001 births
Living people
Sportspeople from Málaga
Spanish footballers
Footballers from Andalusia
Association football wingers
Segunda División players
Segunda División B players
Segunda Federación players
Club Recreativo Granada players
CD El Ejido players
Granada CF footballers